The Westinghouse Atom Smasher was a 5 
million volt Van de Graaff electrostatic nuclear accelerator operated by the Westinghouse Electric Corporation at their Research Laboratories in Forest Hills, Pennsylvania.  It was instrumental in the development in practical applications of nuclear science for energy production.  In particular, it was used in 1940 to discover the photofission of uranium and thorium, and was most cited for certain nuclear physics measurements.  The Westinghouse Atom Smasher was able to make precise measurements of nuclear reactions for the research in nuclear power. It was the first industrial Van de Graaff generator in the world, and marked the beginning of nuclear research for civilian applications.  Built in 1937, it was a  pear-shaped tower.  It went dormant in 1958.  In 1985, it was named an Electrical Engineering Milestone by the Institute of Electrical and Electronics Engineers.

How it worked 

In a Van de Graaff generator, invented in 1929 by Robert J. Van de Graaff, an endless rubber or fabric belt carries electric charges from a roller at the base of the device and deposits them inside a hollow metal electrode at the top. This causes a high voltage to develop between electrodes at the top and bottom of the apparatus.

In the Westinghouse machine, two high-speed belts traveled up a 47-foot shaft to a mushroom-shaped electrode near the top of the bulb-shaped enclosure, where electric charges were accumulated (see cutaway schematic). Various ions, like those generated from hydrogen gas (protons) or helium gas (alpha particles), were injected into the upper part of an accelerator tube. The high electrostatic potential between the top and bottom of the tube then caused these subatomic particles to accelerate to extremely high velocities as they traveled down a 17-inch-diameter evacuated cylinder 40 feet in height, which was a sealed stack of many individual glass segments that collectively composed the largest vacuum tube in the world at the time of construction. The accelerator tube ran between and parallel to the whirling belts to the base of the machine, where the accelerated particles bombarded experimental targets placed inside the tube, inducing various nuclear reactions.

The energy of the particles was measured through the gamma rays that the beam produced when its particles hit a fluorine target, which was directly related to the voltage potential between the machine's electrodes.

The maximum voltage that a Van de Graaff generator can produce is limited by leakage of the charge off the upper electrode due to corona discharge and arcing. At atmospheric pressure, a Van de Graaff machine is generally limited to around 1 megavolt. Thus this instrument was installed inside a pear-shaped 65-foot tall, 30-foot diameter air tank which was pressurized during operation to 120 pounds per square inch. High pressure improved the insulating qualities of the air and reduced charge leakage, allowing the machine to achieve a voltage potential of 5 megavolts. This allowed a beam energy of 5 MeV, although it was originally hoped to reach 10 MeV.

Wartime Efforts 
During the second world war, Westinghouse decided to suspend its fundamental research efforts, and instead focused on researching microwave radar.

Preservation efforts 
In 2012, the property surrounding the atom smasher was purchased by P&L Investments, LLC. The company was run by Gary Silversmith, a developer who intended to build apartments and expressed an interest in saving the smasher.
In 2013, the Young Preservationists Association of Pittsburgh named it as one of the city’s top 10 preservation opportunities. During 2013, plans had been discussed of the Woodland Hills School District establishing a STEM educational facility with the atom smasher as the centerpiece, but the $4 to $5 million cost was prohibitive and the project never moved forward.

By 2015, the structure was in significant disrepair and was dislodged from its supports, due to vandalism and age.  On January 20, 2015, Silversmith had the atom smasher removed from its supports and laid on its side. Workers laid bricks to brace the fall, and tipped it over.   In an email to the Pittsburgh Post-Gazette, Silversmith pronounced his continuing commitment to refurbishing and restoring the atom smasher, saying "The iconic Atom Smasher bulb survives."

See also

List of Pennsylvania state historical markers in Allegheny County
Westinghouse Atom Smasher at Abandoned

References

External links
 

Industrial buildings completed in 1937
Buildings and structures demolished in 2015
Buildings and structures in Allegheny County, Pennsylvania
1958 disestablishments in Pennsylvania